Friendly Driver is a South Korean television program. It airs on tvN on every Wednesday at 20:10 (KST) beginning 24 January 2018, starring Lee Soo-geun, Kim Young-chul, Yoon So-hee and Microdot.

Program
The cast will be at Incheon International Airport looking for tourists and offer to drive them to their destinations for free, accompanying the tourists for their schedules of the day and more services like giving a free tour with a specific theme.

Cast
Lee Soo-geun
Kim Young-chul
Yoon So-hee
Microdot

Episodes

Ratings
In the ratings below, the highest rating for the show will be in red, and the lowest rating for the show will be in blue each year.

References

External links
 

South Korean reality television series